KRFG (102.9 FM) is a radio station licensed to Nashwauk, Minnesota, USA, serving the Iron Range area. It is currently owned by the University of Northwestern - St. Paul.

History
The station originally went on air with call letters KMFG and branded as "The Classic Rock Station". Previously, KRFG was owned by Midwest Communications. In 2016, it was sold to Refuge Media Group, the call letters changed to KRFG, and rebranded as "Refuge Radio", with a Christian AC format.

On July 2, 2019, Refuge Media Group filed to donate the entire network of three main stations and 13 Refuge owned translators to the University of Northwestern – St. Paul, which operates a Christian Talk/Teaching/Instruction "Faith" network (two FM stations, six AM stations and seven translators in eight markets), and a Contemporary Christian "Life" network (ten FM stations and 19 translators in nine markets). Refuge operated translators owned by a third party such as Minn-Iowa Christian Broadcasting were not included in the transaction.

References

External links

Radio stations established in 1997
1997 establishments in Minnesota
Contemporary Christian radio stations in the United States
Northwestern Media
Christian radio stations in Minnesota
University of Northwestern – St. Paul